Luxilus is a genus of cyprinid fish found in North America. They are commonly known as highscale shiners. There are currently nine species in the genus.

Species 
 Luxilus albeolus (D. S. Jordan, 1889) (white shiner)
 Luxilus cardinalis (Mayden, 1988) (cardinal shiner)
 Luxilus cerasinus (Cope, 1868) (crescent shiner)
 Luxilus chrysocephalus Rafinesque, 1820 (striped shiner)
 Luxilus coccogenis (Cope, 1868) (warpaint shiner)
 Luxilus cornutus (Mitchill, 1817) (common shiner)
 Luxilus pilsbryi (Fowler, 1904) (duskystripe shiner)
 Luxilus zonatus (Putnam, 1863) (bleeding shiner)
 Luxilus zonistius D. S. Jordan, 1880 (bandfin shiner)

References 
 

 
Freshwater fish genera
Taxa named by Constantine Samuel Rafinesque